Walter Gerstenberg (26 December 1904 in Hildesheim – 26 October 1988 in Tübingen) was a German musicologist and an expert on Johann Sebastian Bach, Wolfgang Amadeus Mozart and Franz Schubert.

Publications 
 Die Klavierkompositionen Domenico Scarlattis. Schiele, Regensburg 1931; also as (Forschungsarbeiten des Musikwissenschaftlichen Instituts der Universität Leipzig. Volume 2). Bosse, Regensburg 1933 (in addition, music supplement in special issue; at the same time: Leipzig, University, thesis, 1931).
 as editor with Heinrich Husmann and Harald Heckmann: Bericht über den internationalen musikwissenschaftlichen Kongreß Hamburg 1956. Bärenreiter, Kassel among others 1957, .
 as editor with Jan LaRue and Wolfgang Rehm: Festschrift Otto Erich Deutsch zum 80. Geburtstag am 5. September 1963. Bärenreiter, Kassel atc. 1963,  (with Bibliography).

Bibliography 
 Georg von Dadelsen, Andreas Holschneider (editor): Festschrift Walter Gerstenberg zum 60. Geburtstag. Möseler, Wolfenbüttel etc. 1964. 
 Michael Buddrus, Sigrid Fritzlar: Die Professoren der Universität Rostock im Dritten Reich. Ein biographisches Lexikon (Texte und Materialien zur Zeitgeschichte. vol. 16). K. G. Saur Verlag, Munich 2007, .

References

External links 
 

 Gerstenberg, Walter on Universität Rostock
 
 

1904 births
1988 deaths
People from Hildesheim
20th-century German musicologists
Schubert scholars
Academic staff of the University of Tübingen
Academic staff of the University of Rostock
Academic staff of the University of Cologne
Academic staff of the Free University of Berlin